The Ford Reliability Tour, properly called "The National Air Tour for the Edsel B. Ford Reliability Trophy", was a series of aerial tours sponsored in part by Ford from 1925 to 1931 and re-created in 2003. Top prize was the Edsel Ford Reliability Trophy. Henry and Edsel Ford were shareholders in the Stout Engineering Company. In August 1925, they purchased the entire company, making it the Stout Metal Airplane Division of the Ford Motor Company. Their product, the Stout 2-AT Pullman, was a featured plane. The plane was also used by their new airline the Ford Air Transport Service, which started regular flights in April. The flights out of Ford Airport (Dearborn) cross-marketed, and showcased Ford's new interest in aviation.

Awards
Edsel B. Ford Reliability Trophy
Great Lakes Trophy was awarded in 1930 and 1931 to the fastest plane with an engine of 510 cubic inches or less.

1925 National Air Tour

This was called the First Annual Aerial Reliability Tour, sponsored by the Society of Automotive Engineers, with prizes for completion. The course was over 1900 miles with stops in 10 cities.

September 28, 1925, to October 4, 1925:
20 entered, 17 starters, 11 with a perfect score.

Perfect scores (unless noted) –
 E.K. Campbell – Travel Air A
 C. Bowhan – Travel Air B.6
 Walter Beech – Travel Air B.6
 Fred Melchoir – Junkers F.13L (second prize)
 E. G. Knapp – Waco (fourth prize – damaged in forced landing)
 L. O. Yost – Waco
 J. Stauffer – Swallow '25 (second prize)
 Earl Rowland – Swallow '26
 P. Lott – Fokker 3F7
 Casey Jones – Curtiss Carrier Pigeon
 Gy Caldwell – Martin Commercial
 L.B. Richardson – Martin Commercial
 H.C. Mummert – Mercury Jr. (third prize)
 E.G. Hamilton – Stout 2-AT Pullman.
 H.C. Etten – Laird Special (second prize)
 E.A. Goff – Laird Swallow (second prize)
 W.J. Adams – Yackey

1926 National Air Tour
The 1926 Air tour started at Ford Field on August 7, 1926. The event featured the unveiling of the prototype Ford Flivver. There was a field of 25 contestants. A new scoring system for time to "stick" and "unstick" aircraft to the ground helped promote the use of brakes which were unpopular at the time.

The new Ford Trimotor had a prop failure that shook loose one landing gear and an engine on one side. The plane landed hard in a field at Nova, Ohio. Walter Beech won in a Travel Air aircraft.

A Pitcairn PA-2 Sesquiwing won in two of the classes.
A Buhl-Verville CA-3 Airster placed second.
Clarence E. Clark placed seventh in a Travel Air 3000.
Vance Breese placed eighth in a Ryan M-1.

1927 National Air Tour

In 1927, fourteen contestants competed in the air tour.
The winner was Edward Stinson in a Stinson SM-1 Detroiter. The Hamilton H-18 Metalplane “Maiden Milwaukee" placed second.

1928 National Air Tour

1928 featured destinations as far west as Washington state. The launch was timed the same day at Ford Airfield with the 22nd Annual James Gordon Bennett Balloon Race. Phoebe Omlie became the first female air tour pilot flying a Monocoupe. The route placed racers in San Francisco at the same field where Hells Angels was filming.
The winner was John P. Wood in a Waco 10 "The Baby Ruth".

1929 National Air Tour
The 1929 winner was John Livingston who flew 5107 miles averaging 129.97 mph in a Waco, followed by Art Davis also flying a Waco.

1930 National Air Tour
September 11, 1930, to September 27, 1930:
 1 Harry L. Russell in his Ford Trimotor
 2 John H. Livingston in WACO CRG 600Y
 3 Arthur J. Davis in WACO CRG 660Y
 4 Myron E. Zeller
 5 George W. Haldeman
 6 Walter Herschel Beech
 7 J. Wesley Smith (aviator)
 8 Eddie August Schneider (plane 21), in his Cessna AW (NC9092), won the Great Lakes Trophy.
9 Wadlow
10 Bowman
11 Story
12 Stevenson
13 Buch
13 Nancy Hopkins (plane 22), in a Viking B-8 Kittyhawk
14 Carr
15 Meyers
16 Harvey Mummert
17 James Meissner

Among the aircraft, a Pitcairn PCA-2 autogiro was flown by pilot Jim Ray, bringing rotary winged aircraft to the event.

1931 National Air Tour
From July 4, 1931, to July 25, 1931, was the 7th:
 1 Harry L. Russell.
 2 James H. Smart.
 3 Eddie August Schneider, first in single engine aircraft.
 4 Lowell Bayles, in a Gee Bee Sportster, won the Great Lakes Trophy.

Time magazine wrote:
Sensation of the meet was the youngster Eddie Schneider, 19, who fell into last place by a forced landing of his Cessna and a three-day delay in Kentucky, then fought his way back to finish third, ahead of all other light planes.

The following comes from a New York paper:
The second day of the 1931 National Air Tour for the "Edsel B. Ford Trophy" today, was to find the 14 competing planes and a dozen accompanying planes en route from Le Roy, New York, to Binghamton, New York. From Binghamton, the tour is to fly south and west as far as San Antonio, Texas, returning to Ford Airport July 25, 1931. A holiday crowd of about 5,000 persons witnessed the start of the tour from the Ford Airport Saturday morning. Colonel Clarence M. Young, assistant Secretary of Commerce for Aeronautics, came from Cleveland, Ohio to witness the start. Fifteen Army planes from Selfridge Field stunted over the field just before the takeoff and accompanied the tour planes as far as Walker Airport, Walkerville, Ontario At Walker Airport, where the tour planes stopped for a long luncheon hour, they joined the large number of planes participating in the Trans-Canada Air Pageant there. Most of the racers got off to a bad start from Ford Airport. Only flying a Mercury Chic, Captain William Lancaster, flying a Bird and Eddie Schneider, flying a Cessna, got away on time. Leonard Flo, flying a Bird cabin plane, was delayed more than a half-hour when he broke a tail skid just before the takeoff and the two Ford entries were 15 minutes late. The racers were timed from the minute they were supposed to take off. Other entries are Charles F. Sugg, Captain Walter Henderson and Jack Story, flying Buhl entries; James H. Smart and Harry Russell, flying Ford trimotors; Joseph Meehan, flying a Great Lakes; Lowell Bayles, flying a Gee Bee; Eddie Stinson, flying a Stinson and George Dickson, flying an Aeronca. Among the well-known pilots flying accompanying planes are Major James H. Doolittle, referee of the tour, who is accompanied by Mrs. Doolittle and Mrs. Ray W. Brown, wife of the assistant tour starter; Capt. Lewis A. Yancey, who flew with Roger Q. Williams across the Atlantic in 1928, who is piloting an autogiro in the tour; Walter E. Lees, Detroit pilot who holds the world's non-refueling endurance record, and George Haldeman, who attempted to fly the Atlantic with Ruth Elder. Major Thomas G. Lanphier, former commandant at Selfridge Field, is accompanying the tour as far as Binghamton as a passenger. Night stops after tonight will be as follows: Monday, Bradford, Pennsylvania; Tuesday, Wheeling, West Virginia; Wednesday, Huntington, West Virginia; Thursday, Knoxville, Tennessee; Friday, Memphis, Tennessee; Saturday, Birmingham, Alabama; July 12, Montgomery, Alabama; July 13, New Orleans; July 14, Shreveport, Louisiana; July 15, Houston, Texas; July 16, San Antonio, Texas; July 17 and 18, Fort Worth, Texas; July 19, Ponca City, Oklahoma; July 20, Kansas City; July 21, Lincoln, Nebraska; July 22, Omaha, Nebraska; July 23, Davenport, Ia.; July 24, Kalamazoo, Michigan; July 25, Detroit, Michigan. The tour will cover more than 6,000 miles, visiting 18 states. The Ford Trophy will go to the pilot whose plane performs most efficiently, as judged by the scoring formula, over the entire distance. A separate trophy, the Great Lakes Light Plane Trophy, will go to the pilot of the plane of less than 510 cubic inches engine displacement which makes the best score.

2003 re-creation

The tour was re-created in 2003 (September 8–24) from the plans for the canceled 1932 tour. The 2003 tour started and ended in Dearborn, Michigan, circling the eastern half of the United States, with enroute layovers at Kill Devil Hills, North Carolina and Jabara Airport, Wichita, Kansas (Friday-Monday, September 12–15). More than 30 vintage aircraft took part. Most participating aircraft were from the same period of the original National Air Tours. The tour covered 4,000 miles and 27 cities. The public was able to see a great many historic planes land and take off as well as ask questions and tour the inside of several of the larger planes.

References

External links
 National Air Tour
 The Ford Air Tours 1925–1931

 
Air racing
Aviation competitions and awards